Ragnhild Mowinckel (born 12 September 1992) is a Norwegian World Cup alpine ski racer, representing the club SK Rival.

Career
Born in Molde, Møre og Romsdal, Mowinckel won the gold medal at the Junior World Championships in 2012 in the giant slalom and super combined as well as bronze in super-G. Earlier that season in January, she made her World Cup debut in a slalom race at Zagreb. Mowinckel collected her first World Cup points with a 25th place in giant slalom in Schladming in March.

At St. Moritz in December 2012, she improved to 16th place in the super combined and 19th in the super-G. Two months later at the World Championships, she finished 17th in the super combined, 27th in the downhill and 21st in the giant slalom.

Mowinckel had her breakthrough in the 2018 season, taking her first podiums: third place in Super-G in Val d'Isère and runner-up in giant slalom in Kronplatz. At the Winter Olympics in Korea, Mowinckel surprisingly won two silver medals in Giant slalom and downhill; she also finished fourth in combined and 13th in Super-G. Her first World cup win came in giant slalom in Ofterschwang in March 2018, beating home favourite Viktoria Rebensburg.

Mowinckel suffered a serious anterior cruciate ligament injury in March 2019 and another the following autumn; these injuries forced her to sit out the entire 2020 season. She made her return to the World Cup in the 2021 season and has since made steady progress back towards the top. Mowinckel reached her first podium since 2019, when she placed second in the Super-G in Val d'Isère in December 2021.

In the first competition of the 2022 Winter Olympics, the giant slalom, Mowinckel delivered her season's best run in the disclipine, placing fifth.

World Cup results

Season standings

Race podiums
 3 wins – (1 GS, 2 SG)
 12 podiums – (5 GS, 6 SG, 1 DH);

World Championship results

Olympic results

References

External links
 
 
 Ragnhild Mowinckel at Head Skis] 
 Ragnhild Mowinckel at Norwegian Ski Team  
 
  

1992 births
Living people
People from Molde
Norwegian female alpine skiers
Alpine skiers at the 2014 Winter Olympics
Alpine skiers at the 2018 Winter Olympics
Alpine skiers at the 2022 Winter Olympics
Olympic alpine skiers of Norway
Medalists at the 2018 Winter Olympics
Olympic medalists in alpine skiing
Olympic silver medalists for Norway
Sportspeople from Møre og Romsdal